Raymond F. Heinzen (1918-2005) was a member of the Wisconsin State Assembly and the Wisconsin State Senate.

Biography
Heinzen was born on May 11, 1918, in Marshfield, Wisconsin. He attended what is now the University of Wisconsin-Madison and was a member of the Knights of Columbus. He died on September 12, 2005, in Arpin, Wisconsin.

Career
Heinzen was elected to the Assembly in 1960 and to the Senate in 1968. He was a Republican.

References

People from Marshfield, Wisconsin
Republican Party Wisconsin state senators
Republican Party members of the Wisconsin State Assembly
20th-century Roman Catholics
University of Wisconsin–Madison alumni
1918 births
2005 deaths
20th-century American politicians
Catholics from Wisconsin